Kya zan hinga, also known as kyazan chet, is a dish of glass noodles in chicken consommé in Burmese cuisine. It is made with mushrooms, bean curd skin, dried daylily buds, shrimp, garlic, pepper and sometimes fish balls. For the addition of texture and flavour, it can be garnished with coriander, sliced shallots, fish sauce, chilli powder and a squeeze of lime.

See also
 Noodle soup

References

Further reading
Virtual Lotus: Modern Fiction of Southeast Asia – Google Books. p. 322.

Burmese cuisine
Noodle soups